Empress Eudocia, Eudoxia or Eudokia can refer to: 
 Aelia Eudoxia (died 404), wife of Roman emperor Arcadius
 Aelia Eudocia ( 401–460), wife of Roman emperor Theodosius II
 Licinia Eudoxia (422–493), wife of Valentinian III and Petronius Maximus
 Fabia Eudokia ( 580–612), wife of  Heraclius
Eudokia (wife of Justinian II) (fl. 7th century)
Eudokia (wife of Constantine V) (fl. 8th century)
 Eudokia Dekapolitissa (fl. 9th century), wife of Michael III
Eudokia Ingerina ( 840– 890), wife of Basil I
Eudokia Baïana (died 901), third wife of Leo VI
Eudokia of Arles (died 949), first wife of Romanos II, known for the Romanos Ivory
Eudokia Makrembolitissa (fl. 11th century), wife of Constantine X and Romanos IV, empress regnant in 1067 and 1071